This is a list of compositions by the English composer York Bowen (1884 – 1961).

Orchestral
 1902 - Symphony No.1 in G Major, Op.4
 1902 - Symphonic Poem The Lament of Tasso, Op.5
 1904 - Concert Overture in G Minor, Op.15
 1905 - Tone Poem Symphonic Fantasia, Op.16
 1909 - Symphony No.2 in E Minor, Op.31
 1913 - At the Play, Op.50
 1920 - Suite, Op.57
 1922 - Orchestral Poem Eventide, Op.69
 1929 - Festal Overture in D Major, Op.89
 1940 - Somerset Suite
 1942 - Symphonic Suite in four movements (third movement lost) 
 1945 - Fantasy Overture on "Tom Bowling", Op.115 
 1949 - Arabesque for harp and string orchestra (lost) 
 1951 - Symphony No.3 in E Minor, Op.137 (lost)  
 1951 - Three Pieces for string orchestra with harp: Prelude to a Comedy, Aubade and Toccata, Op.140 (lost) 
 1957 - Sinfonietta Concertante for brass and orchestra 
 1960 - Miniature Suite for school orchestra
 1961 -  (unfinished)

Solo instrumentalist and orchestra
 1903 - Piano Concerto No.1 in E flat, Op.11
 1905 - Piano Concerto No.2, Concertstück, in D minor, Op.17
 1907 - Concerto No.3, Fantasia, in G minor, Op.23
 1907 - Viola Concerto in C minor, Op.25
 1913 - Violin Concerto in E minor, Op.33
 1924 - Rhapsody in D for cello and orchestra, Op.74
 1929 - Piano Concerto No.4 in A minor, Op.88
 1955 - Concerto for horn, string orchestra and timpani, Op.150

Band
 The Hardy Tin Soldier

Chamber music
 Three Duos for violin and viola
 Miniature Suite for flute and piano
 Miniature Suite for flute, oboe, 2 clarinets and bassoon
 Soliloquy and Frolic for unaccompanied flute
 Sonata for 2 flutes
 Romance in D major for violin or viola and piano (1900, 1904)
 Sonata in B minor for violin and piano, Op. 7 (1902)
 Fantasia in F major for viola and organ (1903)
 Sonata No. 1 in C minor for viola and piano, Op. 18 (1905)
 Allegro de Concert in D minor for cello or viola and piano (1906)
 Sonata No. 2 in F major for viola and piano, Op. 22 (1906)
 Finale of English Suite for string quartet (1908); from Suite on Londonderry Air co-composed with Frank Bridge, Hamilton Harty, J. D. Davis (John David Davis) and Eric Coates
 Phantasie Trio for violin, cello (or viola) and piano, Op. 24
 Poem in G major for viola, harp and organ, Op. 27 (1912)
 Romance in A major for cello and piano (1908)
 Suite in D minor for violin and piano, Op. 28 (1909)
 Phantasie in E minor for violin and piano, Op. 34 (1911)
 Serenade for violin and piano (1917)				
 Valse harmonique for violin and piano (1917)
 String Quartet No. 2 in D minor, Op. 41 No. 2 (c.1918)
 Fantasia ("Fantasie Quartet") in E minor for 4 violas, Op. 41 No. 1 (1907)
 String Quartet No. 3 in G major, Op. 46 (1919)
 Melody on the G-String in G major for violin or viola and piano, Op. 47 (1917)
 Melody for the C-String in F major for viola and piano, Op. 51 No. 2 (1918)
 Phantasy in F major for viola and piano, Op. 54 (1918)
 Two Duets for 2 violas (1920)
 Sonata in A major for cello and piano, Op. 64 (1921)
 Two Preludes for horn and piano (1921)
 Rhapsody Trio in A minor for violin, cello and piano, Op. 80 (1925–1926)
 Quintet in C minor for horn and string quartet, Op. 85 (1927)
 Sonata for oboe and piano, Op. 85 (1927)
 Albumleaf for violin and piano (published 1927)
 Melody for violin and piano (published 1928)
 Phantasie-Quintet in D minor for bass clarinet and string quartet, Op. 93 (1932)
 Sonata in E major for horn and piano, Op. 101 (1937)
 Allegretto in G major for violin or cello and piano, Op. 105 (published 1940)
 Sonata in F minor for clarinet and piano, Op. 109 (1943)
 Sonata in E minor for violin and piano, Op. 112 (1945)
 Trio in 3 Movements in E minor for violin, cello and piano, Op. 118 (1945)
 Sonata for flute and piano, Op. 120 (1946)
 Sonatina for treble recorder and piano, Op. 121
 Song in F major for violin and piano (1949)					
 Bolero in A minor for violin and piano (1949)
 Ballade for oboe, horn and piano, Op. 133
 Rhapsody in G minor for viola and piano, Op. 149 (1955)
 Three Pieces for viola d'amore and piano, Op. 153
 Poem for viola d'amore and piano (1957)
 Piece for Viola in E (1960)
 Introduction and Allegro in D minor for viola d'amore and piano (1961)
Two Sketches for solo violin, The Clown. The Dragonfly (1961) http://www.musicweb-international.com/classrev/2001/July01/yorkbowen.htm 

Organ
 Melody in G minor
 Fantasia in G minor, Op. 136
 Wedding March in F major (1961)

Piano
Two Pianos
 Ballade Two Pieces, Op. 106 (1939)
 Sonata No. 2 in E minor, Op. 107 (1941)
 Waltz in C, Op. 108 (1941)
 Arabesque in F major, Op. 119 (published 1947)
 Theme and Variations, Op. 139 (1951)

Piano 4-hands
 Suite in Three Movements, Op. 52 (1918)
 Suite No. 2, Op. 71
 4 Pieces for Piano Duet, Op. 90
 Suite, Op. 111

Piano solo
 Spare Moments (Books 1 & 2), Op. 1
 Silhouettes, 7 Morceaux Mignons, Op. 2
 Four Pieces, Op. 3
 Sonata No. 1 in B minor, Op. 6 (published 1902)
 Stray Fancies, 4 Little Pieces, Op. 8
 First Rhapsody, Op. 8 (1902)
 Sonata No. 2 in C minor, Op. 9 (1901)
 Concert Study No. 1 in G major, Op. 9 No. 2
 Rhapsody in B minor, Op. 10 (1902)
 Sonata No. 3 in D minor, Op. 12
 Caprice No. 2, Op. 13
 Miniature Suite in C major, Op. 14 (1904)
 Nocturne (1904)
 A Whim, Op. 19 No. 2
 Three Pieces, Op. 20 (1905)
     Arabesque     Rêverie d'amour     Bells, An Impression
 Polonaise in F major, Op. 26 No. 2 (1906)
 Humoresque in G major (1908)
 Concert Study No. 1 in F major, Op. 32
 Short Sonata [Piano Sonata No. 4] in C minor, Op. 35 No. 1
 Romance No. 1 in G major, Op. 35 No. 2 (1913)
 Suite No. 3, Op. 38
 Evening Calm in B major (1915)
 Suite Mignonne, Suite No. 4 for Piano, Op. 39 (1915)
 Curiosity Suite, Suite No. 5 for Piano, Op. 42
 Three Sketches, Op. 43 (published 1916)
 Three Miniatures, Op. 44 (1916)
 Romance No. 2 in F, Op. 45 (1917)
 Twelve Studies, Op. 46
 Ballade No. 1 (1919)
 Three Serious Dances, Op. 51 (1919)
 Mood Phases, Op. 52
 Those Children!, 5 Impressions, Op. 55
 Fragments from Hans Andersen, Suite for Piano, Part One, Op. 58
 Fragments from Hans Andersen, Suite for Piano, Part Two, Op. 59
 Fragments from Hans Andersen, Suite for Piano, Part Three, Op. 61
 Variations and Fugue on an Unoriginal Theme, Op. 62
 A Cradle Song, Op. 63
 Sonata No. 5 in F minor, Op. 72 (1923)
 The Way to Polden (An Ambling Tune), Op. 76 (1925)
 Capriccio, Op. 77
 Nocturne in A major, Op. 78 (published 1925)
 Three Preludes, Op. 81
 Berceuse, Op. 83 (1928)
 Rêverie in B major, Op. 86
 Ballade No. 2 in A minor, Op. 87 (published 1931)
 Three Songs without Words, Op. 94 (published 1935)
     Song of the Stream     Solitude     The Warning Idyll, Op. 97
 Falling Petals, Op. 98 No. 1
 Turnstiles, Op. 98 No. 3
 Twelve Easy Impromptus, Op. 99
 Two Pieces, Op. 100
     Ripples, A Short Sketch in F major (1937)
     Shadows, Prelude in D major
 Prelude in G minor
 Twenty-Four Preludes in All Major and Minor Keys, Op. 102 (1938, published 1950)
 Three Novelettes, Op. 124 (published 1949)
 Siciliano (in F major) and Toccatina (in A minor), Op. 128 (1948)
 Fantasia in G minor, Op. 132 (1948)
 Two Intermezzi, Op. 141 (1951)
 Sonatina, Op. 144 (1954)
 Four Bagatelles, Op. 147 (1956)
 Toccata, Op. 155 (1957)
 Partita, Op. 156 (1960)
 Sonata No. 6 in B minor, Op. 160 (1961)

Vocal
 Cordovan Love Song, Op. 68 No. 4; words by George Leveson-Gower
 Four Chinese Lyrics, Op. 48
 The Hidden Treasure; words by George Leveson-Gower
 If You Should Frown; words by George Leveson-Gower
 In June; words by George Leveson-Gower
 Love's Reckoning; words by George Leveson-Gower
 Love and Death; words by George Leveson-Gower
 A Moonlight Night; words by Robert Southey
 Storm Song; words by George Leveson-Gower
 We Two The Wind's an Old Woman, Op. 75 No. 1; words by Wilfrid Thorley

Notes

References
Watson, Monica. York Bowen: A Centenary Tribute'' (London, Thames, 1984)

Bowen